Olidata is an Italian computer system manufacturer. The company was founded in Cesena, Italy in 1982 by Carlo Rossi and Adolfo Savini as a limited liability company (LLC).  Olidata specializes in software development. The company's accounting software and administrative software divisions were eventually sold to Olivetti.

Olidata is one of the largest manufacturers of computer hardware in Italy.

The company also manufactures LCD televisions. In April 2008, Olidata announced the production of its JumPc, a modified version of Intel's Classmate PC.

In 2009, Acer acquired 29.9% of Olidata.

See also

 List of Italian Companies

References

External links 
 Official Site

Computer hardware companies
Electronics companies established in 1982
Italian companies established in 1982
Italian brands
Electronics companies of Italy
Display technology companies